The San Cristóbal of Huamanga National University (in Spanish, Universidad Nacional de San Cristóbal de Huamanga) is a public university located in the city of Ayacucho (formerly known as Huamanga) in southern Peru.

The university was established in 1677 by Cristóbal de Castilla y Zamora, the Catholic archbishop of La Plata o Charcas. Until it was closed in the mid-19th century, it operated mostly as a seminary for the training of Catholic priests. The government of Perú reopened it in 1959 as a national university.

In the 1960s, the university became a breeding ground for communist organizations, including the Shining Path. This group, led by philosophy professor Abimael Guzmán, started there before growing into a violent guerrilla movement that conducted a bloody campaign against the government of Perú and against rival leftists groups. (See also Efraín Morote Best.)

The rector of the university is Homero Ango Aguilar, a biologist.

See also 
 List of colonial universities in Latin America

References

External links
  Official website
  Ayacucho República Aristocrática photo gallery

Universities in Peru
1677 establishments in the Spanish Empire
Internal conflict in Peru
Educational institutions established in the 1670s